Kilian Christoffer Zoll (20 September 1818  9 November 1860) was a Swedish painter, graphic artist and illustrator in the style of the Düsseldorf School. He created genre scenes, landscapes, altarpieces and portraits.

Biography
Zoll was born in the parish of Hyllie in Malmöhus, Scania, Sweden. He was the son of Nils Fredrik Zoll and Catarina Christina Knutsson.
His father was a lieutenant in the Swedish Army. He initially attended Malmö Læromsskola in Malmö, but interrupted his course work to study art in Stockholm. From 1836 to 1849, he studied at the Royal Swedish Academy of Fine Arts with Fredric Westin, Per Krafft and Carl Johan Fahlcrantz, but found it necessary to suspend his work there on several occasions so he could paint and sell portraits to support his education.

While at the Academy, he focused on history painting but, soon after, displayed a preference for scenes from folk life. In pursuit of this goal, from the autumn of 1845 to the spring of 1846 he was enrolled at the Royal Danish Academy of Fine Arts in Copenhagen, where he studied with Christoffer Wilhelm Eckersberg and was inspired by the lectures of Niels Laurits Høyen. 

He then  visited Skåne, Halland, Småland and Dalarna. In 1842, a visit to Botorp  in Linderås parish in Jönköping resulted in a commission for an altarpiece at Linderås Church (Linderås kyrka).  During the First Schleswig War, he accompanied the Kronoberg Regiment to Denmark, but stopped in Copenhagen when Sweden decided not to enter the war; painting portraits there for several months.

From 1852 to 1855, he lived in Düsseldorf where he worked with the history painter, Theodor Hildebrandt and the Norwegian painter, Adolph Tidemand. Then he traveled between Sweden and Düsseldorf several times. In 1856 Zoll tried to get a travel grant from the Academy, but was turned down because he was older than the rules allowed. He married in 1857. While once more traveling through Halland on his way to Düsseldorf he fell ill and died in 1860.

Personal life
In 1858, he married Henriette Gustava Horn af Rantzien, who belonged to an old noble family. He had planned to return to Düsseldorf, but fell ill and died while travelling in Halland. Many of his commissioned works were left unfinished at the time of his death. They were completed by his friend, Bengt Nordenberg (1822–1902).

His works may be seen at the Göteborgs konstmuseum, Nationalmuseum the Nordiska museet and Kulturen in Lund.

Selected paintings

References

Other sources
Biography    Nordisk Familjebok   
Biography   Svenskt Biografiskt Handlexikon

External links

More works by Zoll @ ArtNet
Kilian Zoll Göteborgs Konstmuseum

1818 births
1860 deaths
People from Malmö
19th-century Swedish painters
Swedish male painters
Kunstakademie Düsseldorf alumni
People from Skåne County
19th-century Swedish male artists
Düsseldorf school of painting